Film periodicals combine discussion of individual films, genres and directors with in-depth considerations of the medium and the conditions of its production and reception. Their articles contrast with film reviewing in newspapers and magazines which principally serve as a consumer guide to movies.

Magazines and trade publications
{| class="wikitable sortable" style="width: 100%"
! Title !! ISSN !! Publisher !! Language !! Country !! Frequency !! Publication range !! Status !! Document type
|-
| 1895||||Association Française de Recherche sur l'Histoire du Cinéma (AFRHC)||French||France||3 times per year||1986–||Current||Magazine
|-
| 24 images||||24/30 I/S - Revue 24 images||French||Canada||Bi-monthly||1979–||Current||Magazine
|-
| Academia||||Academia de las Artes y las Ciencias Cinematograficas de España||Spanish||Spain||Irregular||1993–2005||Ceased||Magazine
|-
| Action||||Directors Guild of America (DGA)||English||United States||Bi-monthly||1966–1978||Ceased||Trade journal
|-
| Afterimage||||Afterimage Publishing||English||United Kingdom||Irregular||1970–1987||Ceased||Magazine
|-
|Alphaville: Journal of Film and Screen Media
|ISSN 2009-4078
|Film and Screen Media, University College Cork, Ireland
|English
|Ireland
|Semi-annually
|2011–
|Current
|Journal
|-
| El Amante Cine||||Ediciones Tatanka SA||Spanish||Argentina||Monthly||1991–||Current||Magazine, digital only since 2012
|-
| American Cinematographer||||American Society of Cinematographers||English||United States||Monthly||1920–||Current||Magazine
|-
| American Film||||American Film Institute (AFI) / BPI Communications||English||United States||Monthly||1975–1992||Ceased||Magazine
|-
| Andere Sinema||||De Andere Film.||Dutch||Belgium||Bi-monthly||1978–2000||Ceased||Magazine
|-
| Andy Warhol's Interview||||Inter View, Inc.||English||United States||Monthly||1972–1977||Ceased||Magazine
|-
| Animation Planet||||Inkwell Productions||English||United States||Quarterly||1997–1998||Ceased||Magazine
|-
| Animato!||||||English||United States||Quarterly||1983–2000||Ceased||Magazine
|-
| Anthologie du Cinéma||||Avant-Scène||French||France||Bi-monthly||1965–1982||Ceased||Monographic series
|-
| APEC - Revue Belge du Cinéma||||Association des Professeurs pour (la promotion de) l'Éducation Cinématographique (APEC)||French||Belgium||Irregular||1963–1976||Ceased||Magazine
|-
| Archives||||Institut Jean Vigo||French||France||Irregular||1986–||Current||Magazine
|-
| Art du Cinéma, L'''||||Cinéma Art Nouveau||French||France||Irregular||1993–||Current||Magazine
|-
| Avant-Scène Cinéma||||Avant-Scène||French||France||Monthly||1961–2009||Current||Magazine
|-
| Bianco e Nero||||Fondazione Centro Sperimentale di Cinematografia||Italian||Italy||3 times per year||1937–||Current||Magazine
|-
| The Big Reel||||F+W Publications||English||United States||Bi-monthly||1974–2008||Ceased||Magazine
|-
| Billboard||||Billboard-Hollywood Reporter Media Group||English||United States||Weekly||1894–||Current||Magazine
|-
| BoxOffice||||BoxOffice Media||English||United States||Weekly||1920–||Current||Magazine
|-
| Bref||||Agence du court métrage||French||France||Bi-monthly||1989–||Current||Magazine
|-
|British Cinematographer
|ISSN 1477-1020
|
|English
|United Kingdom
|Monthly
|2010-
|Current
|Magazine
|-
| Bright Lights Film Journal||||Bright Lights||English||United States||Irregular||1974–||Current||Magazine
|-
| Bulgarian Films||||Bulgarian Cinematography State Corp.||English||Bulgaria||8 times per year||1960–1990||Ceased||Magazine
|-
| Ça||||Editions Albatros||French||France||Irregular||1973–1980||Ceased||Magazine
|-
| Cahiers de la Cinémathèque||||Institut Jean Vigo||French||France||Annually||1971–2007||Ceased||Magazine
|-
| Cahiers du cinéma||||Cahiers du Cinéma||French||France||Monthly||1951–||Current||Magazine
|-
| Caimán Cuadernos de Cine||||Caimán Ediciones||Spanish||Spain||Monthly||2012—||Current||Magazine
|-
| Canadian Film Weekly||||Film Publications of Canada||English||Canada||Weekly||1936–1970||Ceased||Magazine
|-
| Canadian Moving Pictures Digest||||||English||Canada||Weekly||1915–1957||Ceased||Magazine
|-
| Cantrills Filmnotes||||Arthur & Corinne Cantrill Eds. & Pubs.||English||Australia||Irregular||1971–2000||Ceased||Magazine
|-
| Casablanca||||Prensa Cinematográfica, S.A.||Spanish||Spain||Monthly||1981–1985||Ceased||Magazine
|-
| Castoro Cinema, Il||||Il Castoro||Italian||Italy||Bi-monthly||1974–||Current||Magazine
|-
| Celuloide||||Celuloide||Portuguese||Portugal||Monthly||1957–1986||Ceased||Magazine
|-
| Chaplin||||Svenska filminstitutet||Swedish||Sweden||Bi-monthly||1959–1997||Ceased||Magazine
|-
| Cine||||Cineteca Nacional (México)||Spanish||Mexico||Monthly||1978–1980||Ceased||Magazine
|-
| Cine al Dia||||Sociedad Civil Cine al Día||Spanish||Venezuela||Irregular||1967–1983||Ceased||Magazine
|-
| Ciné-Bulles||||Association des Cinémas Parallèles du Québec||French||Canada||Quarterly||1982–||Current||Magazine
|-
| Cine Cubano||||Instituto Cubano del Arte e Industria Cinematograficos||Spanish||Cuba||Irregular||1960–||Current||Magazine
|-
| Ciné-Tracts||||Institute of Cinema Studies||French||Canada||Quarterly||1977–1982||Ceased||Magazine
|-
| Cineaste||||Cineaste Publishers, Inc.||English||United States||Quarterly||1967–||Current||Magazine
|-
| Cinefex||||Cinefex||English||United States||Quarterly||1980–2021||Ceased||Magazine
|-
| Cineforum||||Federazione Italiana Cineforum||Italian||Italy||Monthly||1961–||Current||Magazine
|-
| CineJap||||CineJap||French||France||Irregular||1977–1979||Ceased||Magazine
|-
| Cinema||||Spectator International Inc.||English||United States||Irregular||1962–1976||Ceased||Magazine
|-
| Cinema||||Consiliul Culturii si Educatiei Socialiste||Romanian||Romania||Monthly||1963–1989||Ceased||Magazine
|-
| Cinema||||TV SPIELFILM Verlag GmbH.||German||Germany||Monthly||1975–||Current||Magazine
|-
| The Cinema||||||English||United Kingdom||Monthly||1912–1958||Ceased||Magazine
|-
| Cinema 2002||||Miguel J. Goñi||Spanish||Spain||Monthly||1975–1980||Ceased||Magazine
|-
| Cinéma 72||||Fédération française des ciné-clubs||French||France||Monthly||1954–1999||Ceased||Magazine
|-
| Cinema Canada||||Cinema Canada Magazine Foundation||English||Canada||Monthly||1967–1989?||Ceased||Magazine
|-
| Cinéma d'Aujourd'hui||||Cinéma d'Aujourd'hui Films Ed.||French||France||Irregular||1975–1980||Ceased||Magazine
|-
| Cinema in India||||National Film Development Corporation Limited||English||India||Quarterly||1987–?||Ceased||Magazine
|-
| Cinema Novo||||||Portuguese||Portugal||Bi-monthly||1978–?||Ceased||Magazine
|-
| Cinema Nuovo||||Edizioni Dedalo||Italian||Italy||Bi-monthly||1952–1996||Ceased||Magazine
|-
| Cinema Papers||||Niche Media Pty Ltd||English||Australia||Bi-monthly||1974–2001||Ceased||Magazine
|-
| Cinéma Québec||||Jean-Pierre Tadros||French||Canada||Monthly||1971–1978||Ceased||Magazine
|-
| Cinema Scope||||Cinema Scope Publishing||English||Canada||Quarterly||1999–||Current||Magazine
|-
| Cinema World (电影世界)||||Changchun Film Group Periodical Publishing (长影集团期刊出版公司)||Simplified Chinese||China||Monthly||1958–||Current||Magazine
|-
| CinémAction||||Corlet Publications||French||France||Quarterly||1978–||Current||Magazine
|-
| Cinémas d'Amérique Latine||||Association Rencontres Cinémas d'Amérique Latine de Toulouse (ARCALT)||French||France||Annually||1992–||Current||Magazine
|-
| Cinemascope.it, independent film journal||||Cinemascope.it||English||Italy||Semi-annually||2004–||Current||Magazine
|-
| Cinemateca - Cuadernos de Cine Colombiano||||Cinemateca Distrital||Spanish||Colombia||Quarterly||1977–?||Ceased||Magazine
|-
| Cinemateca Revista||||Cinemateca Uruguaya||Spanish||Uruguay||Irregular||1977–1995||Ceased||Magazine
|-
| Cinematic Codes Review||||Anaphora Literary Press||English||United States||Tri-Annual||2016–||Current||Magazine
|-
| Cinématographe||||Editions du Reel||French||France||Monthly||1973–1987||Ceased||Magazine
|-
| Cinemaya||||Aruna Vasudev||English||India||Quarterly||1988–2005||Ceased||Magazine
|-
| Cineplex Magazine||||Cineplex Entertainment||English||Canada||Monthly||1999–||Current||Magazine
|-
| Cinepur||||Cinepur Friends Association||Czech||Czech Republic||Bi-monthly||1991–||Current||Magazine
|-
| CineSource||||Doniphan Blair/A Media||English||United States||Monthly||2008–||Current||Magazine
|-
| Cinéthique||||Editions Cinéthique||French||France||Irregular||1969–1985||Ceased||Magazine
|-
| Cineuropa||||Creative Europe Media||English, French, Spanish, Italian||Belgium||Daily||2002–||Current||Magazine
|-
| City Entertainment :zh:電影雙周刊||||Film Biweekly Publishing House (電影雙周刊出版社有限公司)||Traditional Chinese||Hong Kong||Bi-weekly||1979–2007||Ceased||Magazine
|-
| Classic Images||||Muscatine Journal||English||United States||Monthly||1979–||Current||Magazine
|-
| Contracampo||||Francesc Lliñas||Spanish||Spain||Irregular||1979–1987||Ceased||Magazine
|-
| Copie Zéro||||Cinémathèque québécoise||French||Canada||Quarterly||1979–1988||Ceased||Magazine
|-
| Creative Screenwriting||||Inside Information Group||English||United States||Quarterly||1994–||Current||Magazine
|-
| Critic||||American Federation of Film Societies||English||United States||Bi-monthly||1972–1972?||Ceased||Magazine
|-
| Cue Sheet||||Film Music Society||English||United States||Quarterly||1984–||Current||Magazine
|-
| Czechoslovak Film||||Czechoslovak Filmexport, Press Department||Czech||Czechoslovakia||Quarterly||1948–1989||Ceased||Magazine
|-
| Daily Cinema||||||English||United Kingdom||Daily||1958–1968||Ceased||Newspaper
|-
| Daily Film Renter||||||English||United Kingdom||Daily||1927–1958||Ceased||Newspaper
|-
| Daily Variety||||Penske Media Corporation||English||United States||Daily||1933–2013||Ceased||Newspaper
|-
| DGA||||Directors Guild of America (DGA)||English||United States||Bi-monthly||1991–2004||Ceased||Trade journal
|-
| Dialogue on Film||||American Film Institute (AFI)||English||United States||Monthly||1972–1975||Ceased||Magazine
|-
| Dirigido por...||||Dirigido por... S.L.||Spanish||Spain||Monthly||1972–||Current||Magazine
|-
| East European Film Bulletin||||East European Film Bulletin||English||France||Monthly||2011–||Current||Online journal
|-
| Eclipses||||Eclipses||French||France||Irregular||1993–||Current||Magazine
|-
| Ecran||||Editions de l'Atalante||French||France||Monthly||1972–1979||Ceased||Magazine
|-
| Écran Fantastique||||Cyber Press Publishing||French||France||Monthly||1969–||Current||Magazine
|-
| Ekran||||Slovenska Kinoteka||Slovenian||Slovenia||Bi-monthly||1962–||Current||Magazine
|-
| Electric Sheep||||Wallflower Press||English||United Kingdom||Quarterly||2007–||Current||Magazine
|-
| Empire||||Bauer Consumer Media||English||United Kingdom||Monthly||1989–||Current||Magazine
|-
| Enthusiasm||||Artificial Eye||English||United Kingdom||Irregular||1975–2003||Ceased||Magazine
|-
| EPD Film||||Gemeinschaftswerk der Evangelischen Publizistik e.V.||German||Germany||Monthly||1984–||Current||Magazine
|-
| Études Cinématographiques||||Lettres modernes / Minard||French||France||Irregular||1960–||Current||Monographic series
|-
| Exhibitors Herald||||Quigley Publishing Company||English||United States||Weekly||1915–1927||Ceased||Trade paper
|-
| Exhibitors Herald and Moving Pictures World||||Quigley Publishing Company||English||United States||Weekly||1928||Ceased||Trade paper
|-
| Exhibitors Herald World||||Quigley Publishing Company||English||United States||Weekly||1929–1930||Ceased||Trade paper
|-
| Eyeball||||Stephen Thrower||English||United Kingdom||Irregular||1989–1998||Ceased||Magazine
|-
| Fade In||||Fade In Magazine||English||United States||Quarterly||1995–||Current||Magazine
|-
| Fant||||Fant||Norwegian||Norway||Irregular||1965–1974||Ceased||Magazine
|-
| FIAF Bulletin||||Fédération internationale des archives du film (FIAF)||English||Belgium||Semi-annually||1972–1993||Ceased||Magazine
|-
| Film||||Stiftung CinéCommunication||German||Switzerland||Monthly||1999–2001||Ceased||Magazine
|-
| Film||||Centro Studi Cinematografici||Italian||Italy||Bi-monthly||1984–||Current||Magazine
|-
| Film & Kino||||Film & Kino||Norwegian||Norway||Monthly||1965–||Current||Magazine
|-
| Film a Doba||||Film a Doba||Czech||Czech Republic||Quarterly||1955–||Current||Magazine
|-
| Film Bulletin||||Mo Wax||English||United States||Daily||||Ceased||Magazine
|-
| Film Comment||||Film Society of Lincoln Center||English||United States||Bi-monthly||1962–||Current||Magazine
|-
| The Film Daily||||Jack Alicoate||English||United States||Bi-weekly||1915–1970||Ceased||Magazine
|-
| Filmdienst||||Katholisches Institut für Medieninformation||German||Germany||Bi-weekly||1947–||Current||Magazine
|-
| Film Directions||||Arts Council of Northern Ireland||English||United Kingdom||Quarterly||1977–1988?||Ceased||Magazine
|-
| Film Dope||||Film Dope||English||United Kingdom||Irregular||1972–1994||Ceased||Magazine
|-
| Film en Televisie||||Katholieke Filmliga (KFL)||Dutch||Belgium||Monthly||1956–2005||Ceased||Magazine
|-
| Film Form||||North-East (Overseas) Trading Co. Ltd.||English||United Kingdom||Irregular||1976–1977?||Ceased||Magazine
|-
| The Film Index||||The Films Publishing Co.||English||United States||Weekly||1906–?||Ceased||Trade paper
|-
| Film International||||Intellect||English||United Kingdom||Bi-monthly||2003–||Current||Magazine
|-
| Film Ireland||||Filmbase, Centre for Film and Video||English||Republic of Ireland (Eire)||Bi-monthly||1992–2013||Ceased||Magazine
|-
| Film Journal||||The Film Journal ||English||United States||Irregular||1971–1975||Ceased||Magazine
|-
| Film Library Quarterly||||Film Library Information Council||English||United States||Quarterly||1968–1984||Ceased||Magazine
|-
| Film Reader||||Northwestern University, Film Division||English||United States||Irregular||1975–1982?||Ceased||Magazine
|-
| Film.sk||||Slovak Film Institute||Slovak||Slovakia||Monthly||1999–||Current||Magazine
|-
| Film Society Review||||American Federation of Film Societies||English||United States||Monthly||1965–1972||Ceased||Magazine
|-
| Film West||||Galway Film Centre||English||Republic of Ireland (Eire)||Quarterly||1989–2001||Ceased||Magazine
|-
| Filmavisa||||Norsk Filmsenter||Norwegian||Norway||Quarterly||1977–1981||Ceased||Magazine
|-
| Filmbulletin||||Filmbulletin||German||Switzerland||Irregular||1958–||Current||Magazine
|-
| Filmcritica||||Thesan & Turan||Italian||Italy||Monthly||1950–||Current||Magazine
|-
| Filme Cultura||||Empresa Brasileira de Filmes||Portuguese||Brazil||Irregular||1966–1987?||Ceased||Magazine
|-
| Filméchange||||Editions des Quatre Vents||French||France||Irregular||1977–1990||Ceased||Magazine
|-
| F.I.L.M.E. Magazine||||Film & Kino||Spanish||Mexico||Irregular||2011–||Current||Online magazine
|-
| Filmfacts||||American Film Institute||English||United States||Bi-weekly||1958–1977||Ceased||Magazine
|-
| Filmfaust||||Filmfaust Verlag||German||Germany||Irregular||1976–1996||Ceased||Magazine
|-
| Filmfax||||Filmfax||English||United States||Bi-monthly||1986–||Current||Magazine
|-
| Filmgeschichte||||Deutsche Kinemathek||German||Germany||Irregular||1996–2005||Ceased||Magazine
|-
| Filmhäftet||||Filmhäftet||Swedish||Sweden||Bi-monthly||1973–2002||Ceased||Magazine
|-
| Filmihullu||||Filmihullu ry||Finnish||Finland||Bi-monthly||1968–||Current||Magazine
|-
| Filmkrant||||Filmkrant, de||Dutch||The Netherlands||Monthly||1981–||Current||Magazine
|-
| Filmkritik||||Filmkritiker Kooperative||German||German Federal Republic||Monthly||1957–1984||Ceased||Magazine
|-
| Filmkultura||||Magyar Filmintézet igazgátoja||Hungarian||Hungary||Monthly||1960–1995||Ceased||Magazine
|-
| Filmmagie||||Filmmagie vzw||Dutch||Belgium||Monthly||2006–||Current||Magazine
|-
| Filmmakers Monthly newsletter||||Suncraft International||English||United States||Monthly||1968–1982||Ceased||Magazine
|-
| Filmnews||||Sydney Filmmakers Co-operative / Australian Film Commission||English||Australia||Monthly||1971–1995||Ceased||Magazine
|-
| Filmograph||||Murray Summers, Ed. & Pub.||English||United States||Quarterly||1970–1976||Ceased||Magazine
|-
| Filmoteca||||Universidad Nacional Autonoma de Mexico (UNAM)||Spanish||Mexico||Unknown||1979–?||Ceased||Magazine
|-
| Filmowy Serwis Prasowy||||Agencja Dystrybycji Filmowej||Polish||Poland||Bi-monthly||1955–1996||Ceased||Magazine
|-
| Filmrutan||||Sveriges Förenade Filmstudios (SFF)||Swedish||Sweden||Quarterly||1958–||Current||Magazine
|-
| Films||||Ocean Publications||English||United Kingdom||Monthly||1980–1985||Ceased||Magazine
|-
| Films & Filming||||Brevet Publishing Limited||English||United Kingdom||Monthly||1954–1990||Ceased||Magazine
|-
| Films in Review||||National Board of Review of Motion Pictures||English||United States||Monthly||1950–1997||Ceased||Magazine
|-
| Films of the Golden Age||||Muscatine Journal||English||United States||Quarterly||1995–||Current||Magazine
|-
| Focus on Film||||Tantivy Press||English||United Kingdom||Quarterly||1970–1981||Ceased||Magazine
|-
| Fotogramas||||Hearst Communications||Spanish||Spain||Monthly||1946–||Current||Magazine
|-
| Found Footage Magazine||||FFM||English||Spain||Semi-annually||2014–||Current||Film studies journal
|-
| Glamour Girls of the Silver Screen's Quarterly Newsletter||||Glamour Girls of the Silver Screen||English||Austria||Quarterly||2004–||Current||Online magazine
|-
| Guia de Filmes||||Empresa Brasileira de Filmes||Portuguese||Brazil||Irregular||1967–1987||Ceased||Magazine
|-
| Hablemos de Cine||||Hablemos de Cine||Spanish||Peru||Irregular||1965–1984||Ceased||Magazine
|-
| Harrison's Hollywood Reviews||||P. S. Harrison||English||United States||Weekly||196?–1962||Ceased||Magazine
|-
| Harrison's Reports||||P. S. Harrison||English||United States||Weekly||1919–1962||Ceased||Magazine
|-
| The Hollywood Reporter||||Billboard-Hollywood Reporter Media Group||English||United States||Daily/Weekly||1930–||Current||Newspaper/magazine
|-
| Hrvatski filmski ljetopis||||Croatian Film Association||Croatian||Croatia||Quarterly||1995–||Current||Magazine
|-
| Hungarian Cinema||||Hungarofilm||English||Hungary||Unknown||1989–1990||Ceased||Magazine
|-
| Hungarofilm Bulletin||||Hungarofilm||English||Hungary||Bi-monthly||1967–1988||Ceased||Magazine
|-
| Illusions||||Imaginary Partnership||English||New Zealand||Irregular||1986–||Current||Magazine
|-
| Iluminace||||Národní Filmový Archiv||Czech||Czech Republic||Quarterly||1989–||Current||Magazine
|-
| Iluzjon||||Filmoteka Narodowa||Polish||Poland||Quarterly||1981–1995||Ceased||Magazine
|-
| Image et Son||||Ligue Française de l'Enseignement et de l'Education Permanente||French||France||Monthly||1951–1982||Ceased||Magazine
|-
| Imagines||||||Spanish||Mexico||Monthly||1979–?||Ceased||Magazine
|-
| Information [Berlin]||||Hochschule für Film und Fernsehen der DDR||German||German Democratic Republic||Monthly||1971–1977||Ceased||Magazine
|-
| Information [Wiesbaden]||||Deutsches Institut für Filmkunde||German||German Federal Republic||Monthly||1973–1983||Ceased||Magazine
|-
| International Documentary||||International Documentary Association||English||United States||Monthly||1982–2005||Ceased||Magazine
|-
| Iskusstvo Kino||||Soyuz Kinematografistov Rossii||Russian||Russia||Monthly||1931–||Current||Magazine
|-
| Jeune Cinéma||||Association des Amis de Jeune Cinema||French||France||Irregular||1964–||Current||Magazine
|-
| Journal of Film Preservation||||Fédération Internationale des Archives du Film (FIAF)||English||Belgium||Semi-annually||1993–||Current||Magazine
|-
| Journal of the Producers Guild of America||||Producers Guild of America||English||United States||Quarterly||1967–1977||Ceased||Magazine
|-
| Kino||||Sajuza na Balgarskite Filmovi Dejci i Ministerstvoto na Kulturata (Union of Bulgarian filmmakers)||Bulgarian||Bulgaria||Bi-monthly||1991–||Current||Magazine
|-
| ||||Fundacja Kino||Polish||Poland||Monthly||1966–||Current||Magazine
|-
|Kino-Teatr|
|National University of "Kyiv-Mohyla Academy"
|Ukrainian
|Ukraine
|Bi-Monthly
|1995–
|Current
|Magazine
|-
| Kinoizkustvo||||Komitet za Izkustvo i Kultura||Bulgarian||Bulgaria||Monthly||1946–1990||Ceased||Magazine
|-
| Lähikuva||||Lähikuva||Finnish||Finland||Quarterly||1980–||Current||Magazine
|-
| Little White Lies||||The Church of London||English||United Kingdom||Bi-Monthly||2005–||Current||Magazine
|-
| Lumiere||||Incorporated Newsagencies Company||English||Australia||Monthly||1970–1974||Ceased||Magazine
|-
| Lumière du Cinéma||||Lumière du Cinéma||French||France||Monthly||1977–1981||Ceased||Magazine
|-
| Maarvon (Western)||   ||Maayan Poetry Association||Hebrew||Israel||Annually||2005–||Current||Magazine
|-
| MacGuffin||||Alfred Hitchcock Special Interest Group||English||Australia||Irregular||1990–||Current||Magazine
|-
| Magazines of the Movies||||Magazines of the Movies||English||United Kingdom||Annually||1990–1995||Ceased||Magazine
|-
| Media||||Commission des Communautés européennes||French||Belgium||Bi-monthly||1991–1999||Ceased||Magazine
|-
| Media Play News||  ||JCH Media Inc.||English||United States||Monthly||2018–||Current||Magazine
|-
| Mensuel du Cinéma||||Mensuel du Cinéma||French||France||Monthly||1992–1994||Ceased||Magazine
|-
| Meteor||||PVS||German||Austria||Quarterly||1995–1999||Ceased||Magazine
|-
| Metro||||Australian Teachers of Media (ATOM)||English||Australia||Quarterly||1974–||Current||Magazine
|-
| Millimeter||||Prism Business Media||English||United States||Monthly||1973–||Current||Trade journal
|-
| Modern Review||||||English||United Kingdom||Bi-monthly||1991–1995||Ceased||Magazine
|-
| Monogram||||Monogram Publications||English||United Kingdom||Irregular||1971–1975||Ceased||Magazine
|-
| Monthly Film Bulletin||||British Film Institute (BFI)||English||United Kingdom||Monthly||1934–1991||Ceased||Magazine
|-
| Motion Picture News||||Exhibitors' Times Inc.||English||United States||Weekly||1913–1930||Ceased||Trade paper
|-
| Motion Picture Herald||||Quigley Publishing Company||English||United States||Weekly||1931–1972||Ceased||Trade paper
|-
| Movie||||Movie||English||United Kingdom||Irregular||1962–1990?||Ceased||Magazine
|-
| Movie Advertising Collector||||George Reed, Ed. & Pub.||English||United States||Bi-monthly||1990–1997||Ceased||Monographic series
|-
| Moviemag.it https://www.moviemag.it/]||||Movie Magazine||italian||Italy||Bi-weekly||2019–||Current||Magazine
|-
| MovieMaker ||||Disticor Magazine Distribution Services||English||United States||Quarterly||1993–||Current||Magazine
|-
| Movietone News||||Seattle Film Society||English||United States||Irregular||1971–1981||Ceased||Magazine
|-
| Moving Picture News||||Cinematograph Publishing Co.||English||United States||Weekly||1908–1913||Ceased||Trade paper
|-
| The Moving Picture World||||Chalmers Publishing Company||English||United States||Weekly||1907–1927||Ceased||Trade journal
|-
| MyM||||MCM Central||English||United Kingdom||Monthly||2012–||Current||Magazine
|-
| New Canadian Film||||Cinémathèque québécoise||English||Canada||Irregular||1968–1978||Ceased||Magazine
|-
| Nickel Odeon||||Nickel Odeon Dos S.A.||Spanish||Spain||Quarterly||1995–2003||Ceased||Magazine
|-
| Nosferatu||||Donostia Kultura||Spanish||Spain||3 times per year||1989–2007||Ceased||Magazine
|-
| Nouvelles Vues||||Québec Cinema||French||Canada||2 times per year||2003–||Current||Journal
|-
| Objetivo|| ||||Spanish||Spain||||1953–1956||Ceased||Magazine
|-
| On Film||||Film Society of the University of California||English||United States||Quarterly||1970–1985||Ceased||Magazine
|-
| Onfilm||||Onfilm Magazine Ltd.||English||New Zealand||Monthly||1983–||Current||Trade journal
|-
| Osian's Cinemaya||||Osian's - Connoisseurs of Art Pvt. Ltd.||English||India||Quarterly||2006–2007||Ceased||Magazine
|-
| Outré||||Filmfax||English||United States||Quarterly||1995–2003||Ceased||Magazine
|-
| Padidar||||Tehran University of Art||Persian||Iran||Irregular||2017–||Current|| Digital magazine
|-
| Panoráma||||Ceskoslovenský filmový ústav||Czech||Czechoslovakia||Quarterly||1974?–1981||Ceased||Magazine
|-
|Photoplay|
|Macfadden Publications
|English
|United States of America
|Monthly
|1911-1980
|Ceased
|Magazine
|-
| Polish Film||||Film Polski||English||Poland||Quarterly||1969–1992||Ceased||Magazine
|-
| Popular Movies (大众电影)||||Popular Movies Publishing (大众电影杂志社)||Simplified Chinese||China||Monthly||1950–||Current||Magazine
|-
| Positif||||Editions SCOPE||French||France||Monthly||1952–||Current||Magazine
|-
| POV - A Danish Journal of Film Studies||||Aarhus Universitet, Institut for Informations- og Medievidenskab||English||Denmark||Semi-annually||1996–||Current||Magazine
|-
| Ray||||Substance Media Ltd.||German||Austria||Monthly||2001–||Current||Magazine
|-
| Recherche Film und Fernsehen||||Deutsche Kinemathek||German||Germany||Semi-annually||2007–2010||Ceased||Magazine
|-
| Refractory: a Journal of Entertainment Media||||The University of Melbourne||English||Australia||Bi-annually||2001–||Current||Magazine
|-
| Restaurations de la Cinémathèque Française||||Cinémathèque Française||French||France||Annually||1986–1988?||Ceased||Monographic series
|-
| Revue Belge du Cinéma||||Association des Professeurs pour (la promotion de) l'Éducation Cinématographique (APEC)||French||Belgium||Irregular||1976–1997||Ceased||Magazine
|-
| Revue de la Cinémathèque||||Cinémathèque québécoise||French||Canada||Bi-monthly||1989–||Current||Magazine
|-
| Revue du Cinéma||||Ligue française de l'enseignement et de l'éducation permanente||French||France||Monthly||1983–1992||Ceased||Magazine
|-
| Romanian Film||||Romaniafilm||English||Romania||Quarterly||1965–1989?||Ceased||Magazine
|-
| Scarlet Street||||Scarlet Street, Inc.||English||United States||Quarterly||1991–2006||Ceased||Magazine
|-
| Scenario||||EDesign Communications||English||United States||Quarterly||1995–2001?||Ceased||Magazine
|-
| Screen International||||Media Business Insight||English||United Kingdom||Monthly||1975–||Current||Magazine
|-
| Segnocinema||||Cineforum di Vicenza||Italian||Italy||Bi-monthly||1981–||Current||Magazine
|-
| Sentieri selvaggi||||Associazione Culturale Sentieri Selvaggi||Italian||Italy||Bi-monthly||1988–||Current||Magazine
|-
| Séquences||||Séquences||French||Canada||Bi-monthly||1955–||Current||Magazine
|-
| Sight & Sound||||British Film Institute (BFI)||English||United Kingdom||Monthly||1932–||Current||Magazine
|-
| Silent Picture||||First Media Press||English||United States||Quarterly||1968–1974||Ceased||Magazine
|-
| Skoop||||Stichting Skoop||Dutch||Netherlands||Monthly||1963–1993||Ceased||Magazine
|-
| Skrien||||Stichting Skrien||Dutch||Netherlands||Monthly||1968–2009||Ceased||Magazine
|-
| Soundtrack||||Luc Van de Ven||English||Belgium||Quarterly||1982–2002||Ceased||Magazine
|-
| Soviet Film||||Soveksportfilm (Sovexportfilm)||English||Union of Soviet Socialist Republics||Monthly||1957–1990||Ceased||Magazine
|-
| Stars||||A.S.B.L. Grand Angle-Opvac||French||Belgium||Quarterly||1988–2000||Ceased||Magazine
|-
| Stills||||Stills Magazine Ltd.||English||United Kingdom||Quarterly||1980–1987||Ceased||Magazine
|-
| Suspect Culture||||Suspect Culture||English||Canada||Unknown||1994–?||Ceased||Magazine
|-
| Take One||||Take One||English||Canada||Quarterly||1966–2006||Ceased||Magazine
|-
| Téléciné||||Fédération Loisirs et Culture Cinématographiques (F.L.E.C.C.)||French||France||Monthly||1946–1978||Ceased||Magazine
|-
| Total Film ||  || Future Publishing || English || United Kingdom || Monthly || 1997|| Current || Magazine
|-
| Trafic||||Editions P.O.L.||French||France||Quarterly||1991–||Current||Magazine
|-
| Travelling||||Cinémathèque suisse||French||Switzerland||Irregular||1969–1980||Ceased||Magazine
|-
| Variety||||Penske Media Corporation||English||United States||Weekly||1905–||Current||Newspaper/magazine
|-
| Vertigo||||Vertigo Publications Ltd.||English||United Kingdom||Quarterly||1993–||Current||Magazine
|-
| Vertigo||||Capricci||French||France||Irregular||1987–||Current||Magazine
|-
| Video Watchdog||||Video Watchdog||English||United States||Bi-monthly||1990–2017||Ceased||Magazine
|-
| Vision||||British Academy of Film and Television Arts||English||United Kingdom||Quarterly||1976–1979||Ceased||Magazine
|-
| Western Clippings||||Boyd Magers||English||United States||Monthly||1991–||Current||Magazine
|-
| WuBen (无本)||||WuBen Film Magazine (无本电影杂志)||Simplified Chinese||Malaysia||Annually||2018–||Current||Magazine
|-
| Women & Film||||Women & Film||English||United States||Irregular||1972–1976||Ceased||Magazine
|-
| World Screen (环球银幕)||||China Film Press (中国电影出版社)||Simplified Chinese||China||Monthly||1985–||Current||Magazine
|-
| Young/Jeune Cinema & Theatre||||International Union of Students||French||Czechoslovakia||Quarterly||1964–1988||Ceased||Magazine
|-
| Z Filmtidsskrift||||Filmens Hus||Norwegian||Norway||Quarterly||1983–||Current||Magazine
|-
| Zoom||||Evangelischer Mediendienst Verein katholische Medienarbeit VKM||German||Switzerland||Monthly||1970–1999||Ceased||Magazine
|}

Scholarly journals

References

 

Bibliography
 Slide, Anthony. International Film, Radio, and Television Journals. Westport, Conn.:  Greenwood Press, 1985. xiv, 428 p.
 Loughney, Katharine. Film, Television, and Video Periodicals: A Comprehensive Annotated''. New York:  Garland Publ, 1991.  431 p.

 
 
Film